Jaffrabad is a census town in Vellore district in the Indian state of Tamil Nadu.

Demographics
 India census, Jaffarabad had a population of 6784. Males constitute 50% of the population and females 50%. Jaffrabad has an average literacy rate of 63%, higher than the national average of 59.5%: male literacy is 69%, and female literacy is 57%. In Jaffrabad, 15% of the population is under 6 years of age.

References

Cities and towns in Vellore district